The following lists events that happened during 2005 in Indonesia.

Incumbents

Events

 The Christian Democratic Party is founded. 
 The Samudra Raksa Museum is established. 
 2005 Indonesia food scare.

January 
 The first issue of Shōnen Star is published.

March 
 March 19 - Jakarta, Indonesia hosted Miss ASEAN pageant for the 2nd time.
 March 28 – 2005 Nias–Simeulue earthquake – The 8.6  Nias–Simeulue earthquake shakes northern Sumatra with a maximum Mercalli intensity of VI (Strong), leaving 915–1,314 people dead and 340–1,146 injured.

April 
 April 2 – 2005 Nias Island Sea King crash.

May 
 May 28 – 2005 Tentena market bombings.

August 
 August 18 – 2005 Java–Bali blackout.

September 
 September 5 – Mandala Airlines Flight 091.

October 
 October 1 – 2005 Bali bombings.
 October 30 – 2005 Indonesian beheadings of Christian girls.

December 
 December 31 – 2005 Palu market bombing.

Births 

 3 February – Nashwa Zahira, top 5 in Indonesian Idol season 3.
 14 March – Betrand Peto Putra Onsu, singer.
 7 June - 
 Ibrahim Khalil Alkatiri, actor.
 Nizam, actor.

 18 June – Adyla Rafa Naura Ayu, actress & singer.
 25 June – Keiko Warman, actor.
 7 July – Fatih Unru, stand up comedian & actor.
 17 July – Calista Amadea, singer.
 23 July – Deven Christiandi Putra, runner up in Indonesian Idol season 3.
 24 July – Amanda Putri Julianti, actress.
 26 September – Rey Bong, actor.
 28 September – Yudetra Atala Jinan, actor.
 18 October – Anneth Delliecia, winner in Indonesian Idol season 3.
 6 December – Yafi Tesa Zahara, actor.
 25 December – Jefan Nathanio, actor.

Deaths 

 11 January – Hans Wospakrik, physicist.& lecturer in Bandung Institute of Technology.
 22 February – Kuntowijoyo, writer and academic.
 23 February – M. Hasan, former chief of the Indonesian National Police & ambassador. 
 20 March – Astini, serial killer.
 2 April – Ismail Hasan Metareum, politician.
 5 April – Z.A. Maulani, former chief of the Indonesian State Intelligence Agency.
 6 April – Abdul Latief, one of the witnesses to the events of the 30 September Movement in 1965.
 4 May – Purwoto Gandasubrata, the 8th Chief Justice of the Supreme Court of Indonesia.
 17 May – Simson Tambunan, former coach & manager of the Indonesian boxer who became Indonesia's first world champion, Ellyas Pical.
 24 May – Mubyarto, populist economy expert who teaches at Gadjah Mada University.
 26 May – Radius Prawiro, economist & politician.
 22 June – Mashudi, former Governor of West Java & Chairman of the Scout Movement.
 28 June - 
 Saleh Afiff, coordinating Minister for the Economy and Finance of Indonesia in the Development Cabinet VI.
 Eki Syachrudin, diplomat & ambassador. 
 29 June – Roeslan Abdulgani, politician & United Nations ambassador in the Sukarno government during the 1950s and 1960s.
 21 July – Otteman III Mahmud Ma'amun, the 13th Sultan of Deli.
 28 July – Saadillah Mursjid, Minister of State Secretary in the Development Cabinet VII.
 30 July – Singgih, Attorney General of Indonesia in 1990-1998.
 6 August - 
 Sumiskum, politician.
 Andi Abdul Muis, communication science expert and Indonesian press freedom fighter.
 16 August – Eddy Sud, famous actor in 1960s.
 27 August – Ruben Gunawan, chess Grandmaster.
 29 August – Nurcholish Madjid, Islamic thinkers & intellectuals.
 5 September -
 Raja Inal Siregar, the 13th Governor of North Sumatra.
 Tengku Rizal Nurdin, the 14th & 15th Governor of North Sumatra.
 18 September – Mus K. Wirya, songwriter.
 9 November – Perry Pattiselanno, jazz musicians.
 19 December – Jacobus Perviddya Solossa, Governor of Papua in 2000-2005.
 25 December – Sriwati Masmundari, an artist & famous as damar kurung painter. 

 
Indonesia